Ewan Morrison is a Scottish author and screenwriter, described as "the most fluent and intelligent writer of his generation here in Scotland" by Booker judge Stuart Kelly.

Early life
Morrison was born in Wick, Caithness in 1968, son of the singer Edna Morrison and the poet and librarian David Morrison. In interviews and essays Morrison has talked about his unorthodox childhood as part of a 'hippie experiment', the childhood bullying he endured and the difficulties he experienced, growing up as a cultural outsider with a stutter (stammer). He claims these experiences have influenced how he found his voice as writer. Morrison graduated from Glasgow School of Art in 1990, learned to manage his stutter and began work as an art critic and filmmaker before turning to fiction writing.

Fiction
Morrison became a full-time writer in 2005 and has since published six novels and one collection of short stories. His seventh book, Nina X, will be published in April, 2019.

The Last Book You Read and Other Stories
Morrison's first book, The Last Book You Read and Other Stories, is a short story collection which explores modern relationships in the era of globalisation and was described by The Times as "the most compelling Scottish literary debut since Trainspotting”. Bertold Schoene in The Edinburgh Companion to Contemporary Scottish Literature, said "Morrison is concerned with the indispensable necessity of personal relationships, the heroic effort it takes to initiate, trust and maintain them as well as the common everyday trials inherent in being generally human in our globalised twenty first-century world…undeniably Morrison’s collection of short stories makes a contribution to contemporary world literature".  The Last Book You Read and Other Stories led Morrison to being short-listed for the Arena Magazine Man of the Year Award in 2006. One of the short stories within it was made into the short film None of the Above, starring Holli Dempsey.

Distance
Distance is Morrison's second novel – "exploring the issue of long-distance relationships, and through this, jealousy, phone sex, parenthood, paranoia, alcoholism and despair". The Telegraph said, "[Morrison’s] narrative voice is completely original. His prose feels utterly contemporary, with a smooth, readable texture. It is an unusual stylistic shorthand as much influenced by text messaging and emails as literary fiction". The Times called it "utterly compelling... On this form, Morrison is one of the finest novelists around". However, other reviewers found the book depressing. "A death would liven things up", said The Scotsman, “…too much verbiage, conversational psychotherapy."

Menage
Morrison's third novel Menage, is about three dysfunctional artists living a life of debauched squalor within a bisexual ménage à trois in the artistic subculture of '90s London. Scotland on Sunday said, “Menage is an accomplished, often poignant, novel…[that] strives to go beyond corrosive irony and world-weary cynicism to recapture a sense of the possibilities of love". The novel innovates with the form of the triad, alternating between the formats of art reviews, past tense confessional memoir and third person present tense.  Morrison based the novel on his experiences within the fashionable nihilistic circles of the New British Art Scene in his years after art school.

Close Your Eyes
Close Your Eyes became Morrison's most highly acclaimed novel to date. The story concerns a woman, Rowan, who was brought up in a hippie commune in the 1960s and 1970s, returning twenty-five years later to search for the mother who abandoned her.  Bestselling author Christos Tsioklas said, "It takes us right to the heart of the turbulent social changes that defined our last quarter century and it is a revealing honest, searing novel about mothers and children, about what it means to be part of a family.  The story, the writing, the moral intelligence: all of it is a knockout.' The Daily Record called it a "mesmerising saga of survival. Disturbing. Outstanding. Written with exquisite emotional perception". While the Guardian described it as "A powerful, moving exploration of New Age life that charts a woman's struggle to look after her child while searching for her own mother".

Close Your Eyes won Morrison the Scottish Book of the Year (SMIT) Fiction Prize in 2014 and brought him the Writer of the Year Award of the Glenfiddich Spirit of Scotland Awards in 2012. Morrison has, in interview and articles, described the book as a partly autobiographical reaction to 'coming to terms with a hippy childhood' and being raised by political extremists.

Tales from the Mall
In the same year Morrison published Tales from the Mall – “'a mash-up of fact, fiction, essays and multi-format media that tells of the rise of the shopping mall, an iconic symbol of our age". Douglas Coupland said "Morrison continues Ballard's tradition of locating menace beneath the sleekness and shine of post industrial life. A truly interesting book". James Frey called it a "new form of literary storytelling". Irvine Welsh called it "truly Zeitgeist writing".  Tales from the Mall won the Guardian Not the Booker Prize in 2012 and was a finalist in the Saltire Society Book of the Year Award and the Creative Scotland Writer of the Year Award in the same year.

Nina X
Morrison's seventh book of fiction, Nina X, was published by Fleet, an imprint of Little Brown, on 4 April 2019. It won the 2019 Saltire Society Fiction Book of the Year Prize, and tells the story of "an extraordinary young woman who is raised from birth in 'ideological purity' in a commune-cult and then escapes into our modern world." The Guardian review of Nina X stated that "this is a book that explores many of the same themes as its predecessor – the boundaries of the self, the clash between extremes of historical attempts at collectivism and the hyper-individualism of contemporary society, the legacy of the (false) idealism of the 60s and 70s."

How to Survive Everything

How to Survive Everything is Morrison's 8th novel, published by Contraband on 1 March 2021. The darkly comic thriller concerns a teenager abducted by her father who believes the world is ending.

Of the book, The Scotsman said, "A terrific and gripping story… a masterclass in storytelling". The Herald said, "a bold and compelling book by a writer whose creative risks … pay huge dividends".

Themes and style
Morrison was described by Greg Gordon in The Times as the "Chronicler of the broken dreams and spiritual desolation that lies beneath the surface gloss of advanced capitalist society".

According to scholar Marie-Odile Pittin-Hedon, Morrison's fiction and essays "show the author’s overwhelming, constant concern with the place of the human in a Globalised world. Morrison defines the globalised world as a world taken over by American-style consumerism and its attendant rampant commodification of everything including the human." Pittin-Hedon claims that Morrison's writing "raises issues not only related to the creative process, or the process of writing fiction, but also to anthropology and sociology." She cites that he shares concerns with the postmodern sociologist Zygmunt Bauman. "The mass manufacturing of individuality" she claims is "a topic which is at the heart of Morrison’s Project."

For Morrison's first five books he practiced "experiential writing" – throwing himself into new experiences in order to write about them "from the inside", including becoming a swinger, a secret shopper and a New Age convert". Since Close Your Eyes his writing has explored the limits of imagination, idealism and freedom.

Morrison's writing has been mistaken for that of a female writer, and it has been said that "he writes convincingly from a woman’s point of view about such topics as breast feeding, depression and how it feels to abandon your child". Author Helen Walsh said that "If Ewan Morrison was a woman, Close Your Eyes would be destined for the Orange Prize shortlist".

Morrison has often commented on how he uses writing to unravel the utopian/apocalyptic mindset that he was brought up with and in 2016, he gave a TED X talk in Oxford on the history and consequences of Utopian projects. Further articles explored why collectives and Utopian projects do not work and why we nonetheless still cling to the hope they offer.

Television and Film
Morrison worked as a television and film director from 1990 to 2004 and as a writer-director in television and film for ten years, directing over 200 hours of television. He has been nominated for three BAFTAs and is the winner of a Royal Television Society Best Drama Award. His first feature film, Swung, an adaptation of his first novel, was produced by Sigma films, directed by Colin Kennedy and starred Elena Anaya (Sex and Lucia, The Skin I Live In).

Personal life
Morrison is married to the award-winning scriptwriter Emily Ballou and they sometimes collaborate on screenwriting. He was originally a supporter of Scottish independence, however, he later publicly stated that he had changed his mind and voted for the union with the UK.

Bibliography
Novels
Swung (2007)
Distance (2008)
Menage (2009)
Tales from the Mall (2012)
Close Your Eyes (2012)

Short stories
 The Last Book You Read and Other Stories (2005)

Anthologies
 The Flash (2007)
 Four Letter Word (under Anonymous) 2007
 2HB (2009)
 Flash: The International short story magazine volume 2 number 1 (2009)
 The Book that Changed my Life (2010)

Films
As writer
 The Contract (1995)
 The Proposal (1998)
 I Saw You (2000)
 American Blackout (2013) co-written with Emily Ballou. 
 Swung (2014)
 None of the Above (2018)

As director
 The Lovers (2000)

References

External links
 Official web site
 Andrew Gallix, "more thanatos than eros", 3:AM Magazine, 28 August 2009
 "Ewan Morrison: My week as a Le Prince Maurice nominee", Sunday Times, 15 June 2008 
 "Ewan Morrison: 'Frozen like some primordial mud-man and with clothes torn, I saw The Stone Roses'", The Scotsman, 22 August 2009
 Irvine Welsh, "Boys keep swinging", The Guardian, 21 April 2007
 Stuart Kelly, "Book review: Ménage, by Ewan Morrison", The Scotsman, 3 July 2009
 Ewan Morrison, "death of a nihilist or obituary for a nobody", 3:AM Magazine, 5 July 2009

Living people
Scottish novelists
Scottish screenwriters
People from Caithness
Alumni of the Glasgow School of Art
Year of birth missing (living people)